John Nicholson is an Australian children's author born in Singapore. He originally worked as an architect, graphic designer and illustrator before taking up writing in 1990.

John lives in the Victorian bush with his wife Jenny and daughter Freda in a solar-powered house they both built themselves. From his books, John has won the  Children's Book Council of Australia Eve Pownall Award three times and shortlisted six times, shortlisted for WA Premier's Children's Book Award, and the Australian Awards for Excellence in Educational Publishing.

Writing and illustrating
 The Australian Woolshed: Build Your Own Model Woolshed (1986)
 Justice and the Courts (1986) - illustrator only
 Hello Listeners! (1988) - illustrator only
 The Amazing Adventures of Amabel (1990) - illustrator only
 Amabel Abroad: More Amazing Adventures (1991) - illustrator only
 Bridges (1992)
 Paper Chase: A Frantic Dash Around the World by Land, Sea and Air (1993)
 Homemade Houses: Traditional Homes From Many Lands (1993)
 Goddess (1993) - one hour TV drama
 The Cruelest Place on Earth: Stories from Antarctica (1994)
 Gold! The Fascinating Story of Gold in Australia (1995)
 The First Fleet: A New Beginning in an Old Land (1996) (Eve Pownall Award)
 Explorers of Australia (1996)
 A Home Among the Gum Trees: The Story of Australian Houses (1997) (Eve Pownall Award)
 Kimberley Warrior: The Story of Jandamarra (1997)
 Ned's Kang-u-roo (1997) - illustrator only
 Who's Running This Country: Government in Australia (1998)
 Fishing For Islands: Traditional Boats and Seafarers of the Pacific (1999) (Eve Pownall Award)
 The State of the Planet (2000)
 Building the Sydney Harbour Bridge (2001)
 Solo Transport: Trains (2001)
 Solo Transport: Ships (2001)
 Heritage Masks (2001) - illustrator only
 Mighty Murray (2002)
 Animal Architects (2003) (Eve Pownall Award)
 The Incomparable Captain Cadell (2004) - for adults
 Australia Locked Up (2006)
 White Chief: The Colourful Life and Times of Judge F.E. Maning of the Hokianga (2006) - for adults
 Transport, Trade and Travel in Australia: Songlines and Stone Axes (2007)
 Transport, Trade and Travel in Australia: Cedar, Seals and Whaling Ships (2007)
 Transport, Trade and Travel in Australia: Wool, Wagons and Clipper Ships (2008)
 Transport, Trade and Travel in Australia: Steam, Steel and Speed (2008)
 Transport, Trade and Travel in Australia: 100 Years of Petrol Power (2009)

See also

References

External links
 Allen & Unwin Author Profile

Alternative writer named John Nicholson - Writer of 14 books in 'The Nick Guymer Crime Series', Long listed for William Hill Sports Book of the Year for  his football  book 'We Ate All the Pies' and writer of the much acclaimed 'Meat Fix

Australian children's writers
Living people
Singaporean emigrants to Australia
Writers from Western Australia
Year of birth missing (living people)